Oh Hu-seong (born 25 August 1999) is a South Korean footballer who plays as a midfielder for K League 1 side Daegu FC.

Club career
Born on 25 August 1999, Oh made his K League 1 debut for Daegu FC on 1 December 2018, coming on as a substitute against Gangwon FC.

Career statistics

Honors
Daegu FC
 Korean FA Cup: 2018

References

1999 births
Living people
South Korean footballers
Association football midfielders
Daegu FC players
K League 1 players